Sandy Ground is a coastal community on the French side of the Caribbean island of Saint Martin/Saint Maarten. 

Sandy Ground is known for its luxury hotels, nature, and beaches.

Geography 
It is located on the west coast in the direction of the Lowlands and the Princess Juliana International Airport.

Hurricane Irma 
Sandy Ground sustained heavy damage to its infrastructure. This Category 5 hurricane made landfall on the island in September 2017, causing $156 million in damage and killing 15 people.

References

 Populated places in the Collectivity of Saint Martin